The 1973–74 European Cup Winners' Cup football club tournament was won by Magdeburg in a final victory against defending champions Milan. It was the first–and only–win for an East German side in a European tournament.

First round 
Albania refused to play.

|}

First leg

Second leg

Sunderland won 3-0 on aggregate.

Sporting CP won 2-1 on aggregate.

3-3 on aggregate, Zürich won on away goals.

Malmö won 11-0 on aggregate.

Magdeburg won 2-0 on aggregate.

Baník Ostrava won 3-1 on aggregate.

Beroe Stara Zagora won 11-1 on aggregate.

Athletic Bilbao won 2-0 on aggregate.

AC Milan won 4-1 on aggregate.

Rapid Wien won 2-1 on aggregate.

Lyon won 2-0 on aggregate.

PAOK won 2-1 on aggregate.

SK Brann won 9-0 on aggregate.

Glentoran won 4-2 on aggregate.

Borussia Mönchengladbach won 16-1 on aggregate.

Rangers won 6-0 on aggregate.

Second round 

|}

First leg

Second leg

Sporting CP won 3-2 on aggregate.

1-1 on aggregate, Zürich won on away goals.

Magdeburg won 3-2 on aggregate.

Beroe Stara Zagora won 3-1 on aggregate.

AC Milan won 2-0 on aggregate.

PAOK won 7-3 on aggregate.

Glentoran won 4-2 on aggregate.

Borussia Mönchengladbach won 5-3 on aggregate.

Quarter-finals 

|}

First leg

Second leg

Sporting CP won 4-1 on aggregate.

Magdeburg won 3-1 on aggregate.

Milan won 5-2 on aggregate.

Borussia Mönchengladbach won 7-0 on aggregate.

Semi-finals 

|}

First leg

Second leg

Magdeburg won 3-2 on aggregate.

Milan won 2-1 on aggregate.

Final

See also
1973–74 European Cup
1973–74 UEFA Cup

External links 
 1973-74 competition at UEFA website
 Cup Winners' Cup results at Rec.Sport.Soccer Statistics Foundation
  Cup Winners Cup Seasons 1973-74–results, protocols
 website Football Archive  1973–74 Cup Winners Cup

3
UEFA Cup Winners' Cup seasons